The Women's National Basketball Association All-Star Game, commonly referred to as the  WNBA All-Star Game, is an annual exhibition basketball game played in the United States between the best players of the Western and Eastern Conference of the Women's National Basketball Association (WNBA). Since 2004, the game is not held in years when the Summer Olympics take place.

Structure
Each conference is represented by a team of 12 players who are currently having the best seasons performance-wise around the league. The starters are determined by fans voting through internet ballots. The rest of the players are selected by league personnel including head coaches as well as media personalities.  At the end of the game, an all-star game Most Valuable Player (MVP) is named, as decided by a panel of media members.

History

In 2004, the game was not played in its usual format due to the WNBA players competing in the 2004 Summer Olympics in Athens, Greece. That year, the USA national team defeated a team of WNBA All-Stars 74–58 at Radio City Music Hall. This game is officially considered to be an exhibition rather than an All-Star Game.  The league also took a month-long break to accommodate players and coaches who would be participating in the summer games.

The tradition of not playing the WNBA All-Star Game during an Olympic year has continued in 2008, 2012, and 2016 (along with the tradition of taking a month-long break during the regular season). The 2020 Summer Olympics were postponed until 2021 due to the COVID-19 pandemic. For the same reason, the beginning of the 2020 WNBA season has been delayed. The league later announced a revised 22-game schedule, but no all-star game was played. 

No official All-Star Game was held in 2010. Instead, there was an exhibition game matching the USA national team against a WNBA All-Star team, with Team USA winning 99–72 at Mohegan Sun Arena. 

The Western Conference leads the overall series 10–4.

All-Star Game results

Four WNBA cities were never selected to host the All-Star Game: Atlanta, Dallas, Indianapolis, and Los Angeles.

Three-Point Contest 
The Three-Point Contest, formerly referred to as the Three-Point Shootout, was held during the All-Star Game event from 2006 to 2010, and then again from 2017 to the present.

Skills Challenge 
The Skills Challenge was held during the All-Star Game event during 2006–2007, 2010, 2019, and 2022.
In 2006, 2007, and 2010, the Challenge was a timed event, but in 2019 onward it changed to a three-round, obstacle-course competition that tests dribbling, passing, agility and three-point shooting skills. The event will showcase a head-to-head, bracket-style tournament format.

See also
List of WNBA All-Stars
Women's National Basketball Association
NBA All-Star Game

Notes

Basketball all-star games